Souvenir is a 2016 romance film directed and co-written by Bavo Defurne. It stars Isabelle Huppert, Kévin Azaïs, and Johan Leysen.

Plot 
A forgotten singer, who once participated in Eurovision, meets a young boxer who will try to convince her to make a comeback.

Cast 
 Isabelle Huppert as Liliane.
 Alice D'Hauwe as Young Liliane.
 Kévin Azaïs as Jean.
 Johan Leysen as Tony.
 Carlo Ferrante as Rudi Riva.

Release

Critical reception
On review aggregator website Rotten Tomatoes, the film holds an approval rating of 50% based on 28 reviews, with an average rating of 5.6/10. The website's consensus reads: "Souvenir flickers intermittently to life thanks to the reliably great Isabelle Huppert, but ultimately proves too wan and predictable to recommend." Metacritic gave the film a score of 49 out of 100 based on 10 critical reviews, indicating "mixed or average reviews".

Accolades
With Souvenir Bavo Defurne won the VFF Highlight Pitch Award at the Berlinale Co-Production Market in 2014.

Other nominations included Best Make-up, Best Art Direction and Best Actor for Kévin Azaïs. The film won the Ensor for Best Costume Design.

References

External links 
 

2016 films
2016 romance films
French romantic drama films
Luxembourgian romantic drama films
Belgian romantic drama films
Films about singers
2010s French-language films
French-language Belgian films
2010s French films